Anissa Meksen (born 29 April 1988) is a French-Algerian kickboxer who is currently signed with ONE Championship. She is the reigning ISKA World K1 Bantamweight champion and the reigning WAKO World K1 Bantamweight champion.

She is the former two time Glory Super Bantamweight champion, and the former WPMF World Muay Thai Flyweight champion. She is also the former French, European and World Savate Champion. 

WBC Muaythai as #1 Super Bantamweight as of April 2020, Combat Press ranks her as the #1 pound for pound female fighter in the world as of May 2020. Combat Press has ranked her in the top ten since November of 2016 when female rankings were introduced, and has been ranked #1 almost continuously since July 2017.

In 2014 she was the Muaythai TV Fighter of the year, while Awakening Fighters awarded her the Fighter of the Year, Inspirational Fighter of the Year, as well as the KO of the Year (vs. Adi Rotem). In 2017 Combat Press voted her the Fighter of the Year. In the same year Glory Kickboxing voted her the Newcomer of the Year.

Meksen is currently signed with ONE Championship, where she competes in the Atomweight Muay Thai and kickboxing divisions.

Martial arts career

Early career
In 2008 Meksen participated in the Nuit de Champions tournament. In the quarter-final bout, she defeated Maiva Hamadouche. In the semi-finals, she defeated Jacqueline Beroud. In the final bout of the tournament, she fought and won a unanimous decision against Cyrielle Girodias.

During World Muaythai Auspicious Celebration, Meksen fought Monoprangroj Kampetch for the S1 Savante Bantamweight title. She won a unanimous decision.

After winning her next two fights, Meksen challenged Sor Tawanrung Kwanjai for the WPMF World Muay Thai title. Meksen lost by decision.

Meksen won her next two fights, before once against contesting the WPMF World Muay Thai title, this time against Hongthong Liangbrasert. Meksen won the fight by unanimous decision.

In 2014, she participated in the season five of Enfusion Reality: Victory of the Vixen. Meksen won her first three fight and faced Iman Barlow in the finals. She won the fight with a stunning second round KO.

Meksen then had a five fight winning streak, before contesting the WFC European Bantamweight Muay Thai title against Yolande Alonso. She won the fight by a high kick KO in the second round.

She then entered the 2015 Kunlun K-1 Bantamweight Tournament. After beating Kailin Ren in the quarter finals, and Xu Zhurong in the semi finals, she faced E Meidie in the finals. She would lose the final bout by decision, after two extra rounds.

After another five fight winning streak, she was scheduled to fight Therese Gunnarsson for the WAKO World K1 Bantamweight title. She would win a unanimous decision.

Meksen would win her next five fights before fighting Chiara Vincis for the ISKA World Bantamweight title. Meksen won a unanimous decision.

Glory Kickboxing
In 2017 she fought Funda Diken Alkayis in the Glory Super Bantamweight Conteder Fight. Meksen won by TKO in the third round.

In 2017 Anissa Meksen defeated Tiffany van Soest to win the Glory title.

Her first title defense was scheduled to be against Amel Dehby. Meksen won the fight by a unanimous decision.

During Glory 56: Denver she faced Jady Menezes in her second title defense. Meksen lost a highly controversial split decision, that would be dubbed the "Robbery of the Year" by Combat Press. Meksen would regain the title in a rematch three months later by way of TKO.

In the first title defense of her second reign, Meksen faced Tiffany van Soest. Meksen won the fight by a split decision. In her second title defense, she faced Sofia Olofsson. She won the fight by TKO, after the doctor stopped the fight after just two minutes.

During Glory 71: Chicago she rematched Tiffany van Soest. Meksen would lose a unanimous decision.

On August 23, 2020, it was reported that Meksen had signed with ONE Championship.

ONE Championship
During ONE On TNT IV, Chatri Sityodtong announced that Meksen will make her promotional debut in a Women's Strawweight Kickboxing-bout against Italian Kickboxer and Nak Muay Featherweight Martine Michieletto, on May 28th 2021 at ONE Empower. The whole card will be female fighters only. Meksen was later rescheduled to face fellow promotional newcomer Cristina Morales, on September 3, 2021. She won the fight by a second-round knockout.

Meksen faced Marie Ruumet in a muay thai bout at ONE 156 on April 22, 2022. She won the fight by a dominant unanimous decision. Meksen called out the reigning ONE atomweight kickboxing champion Janet Todd in her post-fight interview, saying: "I want Janet Todd next for the title shot in kick-boxing".

Meksen faced Dangkongfah Banchamek at ONE on Prime Video 2 on September 30, 2022. At the weigh-ins, Dangkongfah Banchamek weighed in at 115.25 pounds, 0.25 lbs over the atomweight non-title fight limit. Dangkongfah was fined 20% of their purse, which went to their opponent Meksen. After the weigh-ins, ONE Championship posted a video to social media, showing Meksen returning the 20% back to Banchamek as a sign of respect for taking the fight. Meksen won the fight by unanimous decision.

During her in-ring interview with Mitch Chilson following her victory over Dangkongfah Banchamek, ONE Championship announced Meksen would face Stamp Fairtex in a Mixed Rules-bout at ONE on Prime Video 6 on January 14, 2023, at the Impact, Muang Thong Thani in Bangkok. However, Meksen failed to appear at the weigh-ins and the fight was scrapped, with Fairtex instead being matched up against Anna "Supergirl" Jaroonsak in a kickboxing bout.

After Meksen failed to appear, Stamp Fairtex told South China Morning Post she deemed Meksen unprofessional for not showing up, with her camp going as far as to say that they saw Meksen fail to make weight by 3 Kilograms. They were quoted by the CEO of ONE Championship during his interview with the same publication. Meksen responded by reminding the fans that she did not appear due to a family issue and that she would be interested in fighting Fairtex for the Interim ONE Atomweight Kickboxing Championship at ONE on Prime Video 7, after being "shocked" to find out that there would be no decision in her exhibition Mixed Rules-bout, if the fight had no winner after the regulated time, which she would never agree to if she knew in advance. Meksen had recently expressed frustrations with the promotion after not getting a fight with Janet Todd and the Interim Kickboxing title would resolve this issue after waiting for 3 years, but after negotiations with her husband/trainer and the CEO of ONE Championship fell through, Meksen decided to leave the promotion and Bangkok. Meksen was also unhappy with CEO Chatri Sityodtong stating: “He was aware of the situation but preferred to announce that I was ‘unwell’ to clear his name and not take responsibility for my absence at the conference. I have been unhappy since I signed with them and I have cried alot about them. I love what I do, I am a real enthusiast and I have always given everything for my spot and my performance. I have been more than patient but when respect is not at the table we have to leave it.” 

On March 1th, Meksen announced that she has signed with Ares Fighting Championship. She will make her debut at Ares MMA 15 on May 11th.

Championships and accomplishments

Kickboxing
Glory
Glory Women's Super Bantamweight (-55.38 kg/122 lb) Championship (two times; former)
Three successful title defenses (across two reigns)
International Sport Karate Association 
2017 ISKA K-1 Bantamweight (-54.5 kg/120 lb) World Championship
All Fight System Organization
2017 AFSO World Super Bantamweight (-55.38 kg/122 lb) K-1 Rules Championship 
World Association of Kickboxing Organizations 
2016 WAKO PRO Flyweight (-52 kg/114.6 lb) World Championship
Kunlun Fight
2015 Kunlun K-1 Tournament Runner-up (-52 kg/114.6 lb)
Enfusion
2014 Enfusion Reality Season 5 K-1 Tournament Winner (-54 kg/119 lb)

ONE Championship
real One Championship Women’s atomweight kickboxing champion ( current)

Muay Thai
ONESONGCHAI
2013 S1 World Champion
World Fighting Championship
2015 WFC European Championship (-52 kg/114.6 lb)
Venum Muay Thai
2015 Venum Championship (-54 kg/119 lb)
World Professional Muaythai Federation
2014 WPMF Muay Thai World Championship (-54 kg/119 lb)
World Boxing Council Muaythai
2016 WBC World Muay Thai title (-53 kg/116.8 lb)
2014 WBC European Muay Thai Championship (-53 kg/116.8 lb)

Savate
Savate Championships
Savate World Champion
Savate European Champion
Savate French Champion

Boxing
Federation Francaise de Boxe (French Boxing Federation)
France Female Super Bantamweight (55.34 kg/122 lb) Championship (one time; current)

Mixed martial arts record

|-
|
|align=center|
|
|
|Ares FC 15
|
|align=center|
|align=center|
|Paris, France

Kickboxing and Muay Thai record

|-  style="background:#cfc;"
| 2022-10-01|| Win ||align=left| Dangkongfah Banchamek || ONE on Prime Video 2 || Kallang, Singapore || Decision (Unanimous) || 3 || 3:00
|-  style="background:#cfc;"
| 2022-04-22|| Win ||align=left|  Marie Ruumet || ONE 156|| Kallang, Singapore || Decision (Unanimous) || 3 || 3:00
|-  style="background:#cfc;"
| 2021-09-03 || Win ||align=left| Cristina Morales || ONE Championship: Empower || Kallang, Singapore || KO (Left hook) || 2 || 2:27
|-  style="background:#cfc;"
| 2020-02-29 || Win||align=left| Ji Waen Lee || Glory 75: Utrecht  || Utrecht, Netherlands || TKO (Corner stoppage/Injury) || 2 ||  3:00
|-
|-  style="background:#fbb;"
| 2019-11-22 || Loss ||align=left| Tiffany van Soest || Glory 71: Chicago  || Chicago, United States || Decision (Unanimous) || 5 ||  3:00
|-
! style=background:white colspan=8 |
|-  style="background:#cfc;"
| 2019-06-22 || Win||align=left| Sofia Olofsson || Glory 66: Paris  || Paris, France || TKO (Doctor stoppage) || 1 ||  2:06
|-
! style=background:white colspan=8 |
|-  style="background:#cfc;"
| 2019-03-09 || Win||align=left| Tiffany van Soest || Glory 64: Strasbourg  || Strasbourg, France || Decision (Split) || 5 ||  3:00
|-
! style=background:white colspan=8 |
|-  style="background:#cfc;"
| 2018-11-02 || Win ||align=left| Jady Menezes || Glory 61: New York || New York City, New York, United States || TKO (Punches) || 2 || 0:39  
|-
! style=background:white colspan=8 |
|-  style="background:#fbb;"
| 2018-08-10 || Loss ||align=left| Jady Menezes || Glory 56: Denver || Broomfield, Colorado, United States || Decision (Split) || 5 || 3:00  
|-
! style=background:white colspan=8 |
|-  style="background:#cfc;"
| 2018-05-12 || Win||align=left| Amel Dehby || Glory 53: Lille || Lille, France || Decision (Unanimous) || 5 ||  3:00 
|-
! style=background:white colspan=8 |
|-  style="background:#cfc;"
| 2018-03-31 || Win ||align=left| Ashley Nichols || Glory 52: Los Angeles || Los Angeles, California, United States || Decision (Unanimous) || 3 || 3:00 
|-
!  style=background:white colspan=8 |
|-  style="background:#cfc;"
| 2017-12-01 || Win ||align=left| Tiffany van Soest ||  Glory 48: New York || New York City, New York, United States || Decision (Unanimous) || 5 || 3:00  
|-
! style=background:white colspan=8 |
|-  style="background:#cfc;"
| 2017-10-28 || Win  ||align=left| Funda Diken Alkayis || Glory 47: Lyon || Lyon, France || TKO (Foot injury) || 3 || 0:17  
|-
! style=background:white colspan=8 |
|-  style="background:#cfc;"
| 2017-07-14 || Win ||align=left| Jady Menezes || Glory 43: New York || New York City, New York, United States || Decision (Unanimous) || 3 || 3:00
|-
|-  style="background:#cfc;"
| 2017-06-03 || Win ||align=left| Fadma Basrir || Fighters 3: The Way Of The Champions || Oberkorn, Luxembourg || Decision (Unanimous) || 5 || 3:00 
|-
! style=background:white colspan=8 |
|-  style="background:#cfc;"
| 2017-05-20 || Win ||align=left| Gloria Peritore || La Nuit De L'Impact III || Saintes, France|| Decision (unanimous) || 3 || 3:00 
|-
|-  style="background:#cfc;"
| 2017-04-08 || Win ||align=left| Chiara Vincis || Victory World Series: Oktagon Torino || Torino, Italy || Decision (unanimous) || 5 || 3:00 
|-
! style=background:white colspan=8 |
|-  style="background:#cfc;"
| 2017-03-18 || Win ||align=left| Elena Mishchuk || La Nuit Des Titans 2017 || Tours, France || Decision || 3 || 3:00  
|-
|-  style="background:#cfc;"
| 2017-02-04 || Win ||align=left| Maria Lobo || Muay Thai Emperor Chok Dee || Vandœuvre-lès-Nancy, France || Decision || 3 || 3:00  
|-
|-  style="background:#cfc;"
| 2016-11-19 || Win ||align=left| Fani Peloumpi || Radikal Fight Night Gold || Charleville-Mézières, France || Decision || 3 || 3:00  
|-
|-  style="background:#cfc;"
| 2016-10-29 || Win ||align=left| Dilara Yildiz || Best Of Siam IX || Paris, France || TKO || 5 ||  
|-
|-  style="background:#cfc;"
| 2016-06-24 || Win ||align=left| Therese Gunnarsson || Monte Carlo Fighting Masters || Monte Carlo, Monaco || Decision (unanimous) || 5 || 3:00  
|-
! style=background:white colspan=8 |
|- style="background:#cfc;"
| 2016-04-30 || Win ||align=left| Fatima Pinto || Kerner Thai || Paris, France || Decision (unanimous) || 3 || 3:00  
|-
|- style="background:#cfc;"
| 2016-03-26 || Win ||align=left| Meryem Uslu || Master Fight || Chalon-sur-Saône, France || Decision (unanimous) || 3 || 3:00  
|-
!style=background:white colspan=8 |
|-
|-  style="background:#cfc;"
| 2016-03-12 || Win ||align=left| Donatella Panu || La Nuit des Titans 2016 || Tours, France || Decision || 3 || 3:00  
|-
|-  style="background:#cfc;"
| 2016-01-16 || Win ||align=left| Camilla Paiva Rosario || Muay Thai Attitude IV || Conflans-Sainte-Honorine, France || TKO (doctor stoppage) || 2 || 
|-
|-  style="background:#cfc;"
| 2015-11-28 || Win ||align=left| Maria Lobo || K-1 Victory World Series || Levallois-Perret, France || Decision || 3 || 3:00  
|-
|-  style="background:#fbb;"
| 2015-10-28 || Loss ||align=left| E Meidie || Kunlun Fight 32 || Foshan, China || TKO (retirement) || 5 ||  
|-
! style=background:white colspan=8 |
|-  style="background:#cfc;"
| 2015-10-28 || Win ||align=left| Xu Zhurong || Kunlun Fight 32 || Foshan, China || Decision (unanimous) || 3 || 3:00 
|-
! style=background:white colspan=8 |
|-  style="background:#cfc;"
| 2015-08-22 || Win ||align=left| Sylwia Juśkiewicz || Venum Victory World Series 3 || Debrecen, Hungary || Decision (unanimous) || 3 || 3:00  
|-
! style=background:white colspan=8 |
|-  style="background:#cfc;"
| 2015-07-18 || Win ||align=left| Kailin Ren || Kunlun Fight 27 || Nanjing, China || Decision (unanimous) || 3 || 3:00  
|-
! style=background:white colspan=8 |
|-  style="background:#cfc;"
| 2015-05-30 || Win ||align=left| Yolande Alonso || Road to Bangkok III || Cernier, Switzerland || TKO (high kick) || 2 ||   
|-
! style=background:white colspan=8 |
|-  style="background:#cfc;"
| 2015-05-23 || Win ||align=left| Feride Kirat|| Radikal Fight Night 3 || Charleville-Mézières, France || TKO (3 knockdowns) || 3 || 3:00  
|-
|-  style="background:#cfc;"
| 2015-04-18 || Win ||align=left| Eva Naranjo|| Enfusion Live 27 || Tenerife, Spain || Decision (unanimous) || 3 || 3:00 || 
|-
|-  style="background:#cfc;"
| 2015-03-14 || Win ||align=left| Isis Verbeek || Enfusion Live 25: Fight Night 1st Edition || Turnhout, Belgium || Decision (unanimous) || 3 || 3:00  
|-
|-  style="background:#cfc;"
| 2015-02-07 || Win ||align=left| Phet Yodying || La Nuit des Titans 2015 || Tours, France || KO (punches) || 3 ||  || 
|-
|-  style="background:#cfc;"
| 2014-12-13 || Win ||align=left| Yolande Alonso || Victory K-1 || Levallois Perret, France || Decision (unanimous) || 3 || 3:00 
|-
|-  style="background:#cfc;"
| 2014-09-23 || Win ||align=left| Iman Barlow || Enfusion Reality Season 5: Victory of the Vixen || Ko Samui, Thailand || KO (left hook) || 2 || 2:28 
|-
! style=background:white colspan=8 |
|-  style="background:#cfc;"
| 2014-09-23 || Win ||align=left| Ashley Nichols || Enfusion Reality Season 5: Victory of the Vixen || Ko Samui, Thailand || Decision (unanimous) || 3 || 3:00 
|-
! style=background:white colspan=8 |
|-  style="background:#cfc;"
| 2014-09-23 || Win ||align=left| Johanna Rydberg || Enfusion Reality Season 5: Victory of the Vixen || Ko Samui, Thailand || TKO (knee to the body) || 1 || 1:11
|-
! style=background:white colspan=8 |
|-  style="background:#cfc;"
| 2014-09-18 || Win ||align=left| Adi Rotem || Enfusion Reality Season 5: Victory of the Vixen || Ko Samui, Thailand || KO (left hook) || 1 || 2:02 
|-
! style=background:white colspan=8 |
|- style="background:#cfc;"
| 2014-07-28 || Win ||align=left| Hongthong Liangbrasert || WPMF Muay Thai Championships || Bangkok, Thailand || Decision (unanimous) || 5 || 2:00
|-
!style=background:white colspan=8 |
|- style="background:#cfc;"
| 2014-04-12 || Win ||align=left| Alicia Mermoux || Fight Night One || Saint-Étienne, France || TKO (corner stoppage) || 3 || 
|-
|- style="background:#cfc;"
| 2014-03-08 || Win ||align=left| Funda Diken Alkayis || Le Choc des Légendes || Vannes, France || TKO (referee stoppage) || 3 || 
|-
!style=background:white colspan=8 |
|- style="background:#fbb;"
| 2013-12-27 || Loss ||align=left| Sor Tawanrung Kwanjai|| Klongsarn Muay Thai || Bangkok, Thailand || Decision || 5 || 2:00 
|-
!style=background:white colspan=8 |
|- style="background:#cfc;"
| 2013-10-26 || Win ||align=left| Ilaria Stivanello|| Choc des guerriers 3 (K-1) || L'Isle-d'Espagnac, France || TKO (low kicks) || 3 ||  
|-
|- style="background:#cfc;"
| 2013-10-11 || Win ||align=left| Soraya Bucherie || Warriors Night || Paris, France || Decision (unanimous) || 3 || 2:00 
|-
|- style="background:#cfc;"
| 2013-08-12 || Win ||align=left| Monoprangroj Kampetch || Queen's Birthday Event || Bangkok, Thailand|| Decision (unanimous) || 5 || 2:00 
|-
!style=background:white colspan=8 |
|- style="background:#cfc;"
| 2013-07-05 || Win ||align=left| Clarissa Padua || Super Big Match - Muay Thai || Patong, Thailand|| KO (left high kick and punch) || 3 ||  
|-
|- style="background:#fbb;"
| 2013-04-06 || Loss ||align=left| Katia Semail || 7e Trophée Des Etoiles || Aix-en-Provence, France || Decision || 3 || 3:00 
|-
!style=background:white colspan=8 |
|- style="background:#cfc;"
| 2009-05-23 || Win ||align=left| Jacqueline Beroud || France Elite 2009: Combats Féminin || Paris, France|| Decision (unanimous) || 3 || 2:00 
|-
|- style="background:#cfc;"
| 2008-11-08 || Win ||align=left| Cyrielle Girodias || Night of the Champions II /  Nuit de Champions 2008 || Paris, France|| Decision (majority) || 3 || 2:00 
|-
!style=background:white colspan=8 |
|- style="background:#cfc;"
| 2008-11-08 || Win ||align=left| Jacqueline Beroud || Night of the Champions II /  Nuit de Champions 2008 || Paris, France|| Decision (unanimous) || 3 || 2:00 
|-
|- style="background:#cfc;"
| 2008-11-08 || Win ||align=left| Maiva Hamadouche || Night of the Champions II /  Nuit de Champions 2008 || Paris, France|| Decision (unanimous) || 3 || 2:00 
|-
| colspan=9 | Legend:

Professional boxing record

| style="text-align:center;" colspan="8"|2 Wins (0 knockouts, 2 decisions),  0 Losses
|-
|align=center style="border-style: none none solid solid; background: #e3e3e3"|Res.
|align=center style="border-style: none none solid solid; background: #e3e3e3"|Record
|align=center style="border-style: none none solid solid; background: #e3e3e3"|Opponent
|align=center style="border-style: none none solid solid; background: #e3e3e3"|Type
|align=center style="border-style: none none solid solid; background: #e3e3e3"|Rd., Time
|align=center style="border-style: none none solid solid; background: #e3e3e3"|Date
|align=center style="border-style: none none solid solid; background: #e3e3e3"|Location
|align=center style="border-style: none none solid solid; background: #e3e3e3"|Notes
|-align=center
|Win
|align=center|2-0||align=left| Fatima El Kabouss 
|UD
|8
|2017-12-14
|align=left| Palais des sports Marcel-Cerdan, Levallois-Perret, Paris, France
|align=left|
|-align=center
|Win
|align=center|1-0||align=left| Gabriella Mezei
|PTS
|6
|2017-04-22
|align=left| Astroballe, Villeurbanne, Lyon, France
|align=left|
|-align=center

Filmography

References

External links
 Anissa Meksen at Awakening Fighters

1988 births
Living people
French female kickboxers
French Muay Thai practitioners
Female Muay Thai practitioners 
French women boxers
French savateurs
French sportspeople of Algerian descent
Bantamweight kickboxers
Sportspeople from Nancy, France
Kunlun Fight kickboxers
Glory kickboxers
ONE Championship kickboxers